Kevin Maltsev (born 4 July 2000) is an Estonian ski jumper. He competed in two events at the 2018 Winter Olympics. He competed at the 2022 Winter Olympics.

References

External links
 

2000 births
Living people
Estonian male ski jumpers
Olympic ski jumpers of Estonia
Ski jumpers at the 2018 Winter Olympics
Ski jumpers at the 2022 Winter Olympics
Place of birth missing (living people)